Swedish National Export Credits Guarantee Board (EKN) is a Swedish government agency that answers to the Ministry for Foreign Affairs. The agency is located in Stockholm.

Its aim is to promote Swedish exports by issuing guarantees, functioning as insurances, by which the Government of Sweden assumes certain risks. The customers include export companies and banks.

See also
Government agencies in Sweden
Swedish Export Credit Corporation

External links

Export Credits Guarantee Board
Foreign trade of Sweden
Foreign relations of Sweden
Export credit agencies